The Goulburn River, a major inland perennial river of the Goulburn Broken catchment, part of the Murray-Darling basin, is located in the Alpine, Northern Country/North Central, and Southern Riverina regions of the Australian state of Victoria. The river is impounded by the Eildon Dam to create Lake Eildon, the Eildon Pondage, the Goulburn Weir and Waranga Basin.

Location and features

The Goulburn has 41 tributaries including the Black, Jamieson, Howqua, Delatite, Big, Rubicon, Acheron, Yea, and Broken rivers and the Seven Creeks. The river descends  over its  course.

In addition to being the longest river in Victoria, the Goulburn also has the highest discharge and the highest annual flow of any river in Victoria. The area surrounding the river is very productive as a result of irrigated agriculture. The Goulburn (Along with the Upper Murray and Murrumbidgee rivers) accounts for 45% of the Murray-Darling Basin's total runoff. By contrast, the Darling basin contributes just 31.7% of the basin's total runoff.

River quality

Much of the flow is extracted, and the river is very heavily regulated, which has strongly affected the river's ecosystem. With recent years being some of the driest on record in the basin, there has been even further stress on the river's ecosystem. Because of all this there has been much controversy over the construction of the North–South Pipeline, which will pipe  of water annually to Melbourne's water supply. There are arguments that all the water piped to Melbourne will be saved water, by the upgrade of  the irrigation infrastructure in the Goulburn river basin all a part of a food bowl modernisation project. In June 2008 the Murray-Darling Basin Commission released a report on the condition of the Murray-Darling basin, with the Goulburn and Murrumbidgee rivers both rated in a very poor condition in the Murray-Darling basin with fish stocks in both rivers were also rated as extremely poor.

Recreation

The Goulburn Heritage River was declared in 1992 in recognition of its unique natural, recreational, scenic and cultural values. In June 2010, the Victorian Government created the Lower Goulburn National Park to protect and enhance the River Red Gum forests in Victoria. The trees need periods of flooding and can survive inundation for months. Their seeds are washed onto higher ground during a flood and germinate and grow before the next flood reaches them. Hollows and broken branches provide nesting for galahs, cockatoos, cockatiels and various parrots, while fallen branches provide habitat for other animals.

Additional activities on the river include canoeing, sightseeing and picnicking, swimming, and fishing, with Murray Cod, Golden Perch and Spiny freshwater crayfish found in the lower reaches of the river. In the upper reaches, there are extensive forests of very tall mountain ash and mixed species and may be described as typical trout streams.

Etymology
In the Aboriginal Taungurung language, the river has several names: Warring, meaning "big or large water"; Bayyango, where Thomas Mitchell noted that this word appeared to be a generic word for river, and (also in the Ngurai-illam Wurrung dialect/language) Omio with no clearly defined meaning. In the Yorta Yorta language, the river has several names: Koninner, meaning "the country at the junction of the Murray and Goulburn rivers; Gungupna, with gupna meaning "deep waterholes"; and Gaiyila, meaning "father of waters".

Hamilton Hume and William Hovell explored the area in 1824, naming the Goulburn River in honour of Major Frederick Goulburn, the first Colonial Secretary of New South Wales.

See also

 GoulburnMurray Water
 
 Murray Darling Basin Authority

References

External links

 

Goulburn Broken catchment
Rivers of Hume (region)
Rivers of Loddon Mallee (region)
 
Tributaries of the Murray River